Claire Suzanne Martin (born 12 May 1998 in Versailles) is a French former artistic gymnast. She is the 2015 European bronze medalist on the balance beam. She finished seventh on the balance beam at the 2014 European Championships and represented France at the 2014 and 2015 World Championships.

Early life 
Claire Martin began gymnastics at the age of three at a club in Marsannay-la-Côte in a baby gymnastics class. At age eleven, Martin won the French Championships in the avenir division, and then at thirteen she won the espoir division.

Junior career

2012 
Martin made her international debut at the International Gymnix in Montreal where she placed thirty-third in the all-around and fifth on the balance beam. She competed at the Junior European Championships and finished seventh with the French team. She won the all-around bronze medal at the French Junior Championships.

2013 
Martin began her season by becoming French junior champion on the floor exercise and finishing second in the all-around and on the balance beam. A few months later, she competed in a friendly meet against Romania where she took silver in the all-around and bronze on the floor exercise. She then competed at the European Youth Olympic Festival in the Netherlands. She finished fourth in the team competition and won the bronze medal on the balance beam. At the end of the summer, she decided to leave her training center in Dijon to join INSEP in Paris. In September 2013, Martin won the all-around bronze medal at the National Cup in Mouilleron-le-Captif. She also finished fourth in the team competition, seventh in the all-around, and fifth on the balance beam at the Élite Gym Massilia in Marseille.

Senior career

2014 
At her first senior competition, Martin finished fifth in the all-around at the French Championships. She then competed at a friendly meet against Romania and Belgium and helped the French team finish second. At the European Championships, she qualified for the balance beam final, but she crashed her double back dismount and finished in seventh place. She competed at a friendly meet against the Netehrlands and Austria and helped the French team finish second. At the end of the season, Martin was selected to compete at the World Championships in Nanning, China where the French team finished thirteenth. She ended her season at the Élite Gym Massilia where she won the gold medal on the balance beam, finished twelfth on the all-around and sixth on the floor exercise.

2015 

Martin finished second on the balance beam and the floor exercise and fifth in the all-around at the French Championships in Rouen. At the Doha World Cup, she finished eighth on the floor exercise. She was selected for the European Championships in Montpellier where she finished thirteenth in the all-around and won the bronze medal on the balance beam behind Andreea Munteanu and Becky Downie.  She then competed at two friendly meets- first against Romania where the French team finished second and then against Spain which France won. She was then selected to compete at the World Championships in Glasgow alongside Marine Brevet, Loan His, Anne Kuhm, Valentine Pikul, and Louise Vanhille, and they placed tenth. She finished her season at the Élite Gym Massilia where she finished sixth on the balance beam.

2016-2017 
Martin's final competition was the 2016 French Championships where she only competed on the balance beam and floor exercise- failing to qualify for either event final. She retired in January 2017 due to various injuries following the 2015 World Championships.

Competitive history

Junior

Senior

References

External links 
 

1998 births
Living people
French female artistic gymnasts
Sportspeople from Versailles, Yvelines
Gymnasts from Paris
21st-century French women